Armand Mastroianni (born August 1, 1948) is an American film director and producer.

Biography
Armand Mastroianni's directorial debut was the 1980 horror film He Knows You're Alone which was also the screen debut of actor Tom Hanks. He has directed some studio films such as The Celestine Prophecy, the bulk of his career has mainly been focused on directing television films, such as "The Ring," "First Daughter," One of Her Own, and Robin Cook's "Invasion," and television dramas, such as  "Dark Shadows" and "Nightmare Cafe."  He is currently producing and directing material for his production company.  He is the father of Paul Mastroianni, who is also pursuing a career in filmmaking.

Filmography

Feature films & Miniseries

Television series

External links
 

American people of Italian descent
1948 births
Living people
American film directors
American television directors